The Spook Who Sat by the Door (1969), by Sam Greenlee, is the fictional story of Dan Freeman, the first black CIA officer, and of the CIA's history of training persons and political groups who later used their specialised training in gathering intelligence, political subversion, and guerrilla warfare against the CIA. The novel has been described as "part thriller, part satire and part social commentary". As described by The New Yorker, the title "alludes to the conspicuous deployment of the agency's one black officer to display its phony integration".

The author, Sam Greenlee, was told by Aubrey Lewis (1935–2001), one of the first black FBI agents recruited to the Bureau in 1962, that The Spook Who Sat by the Door was required reading at the FBI Academy in Quantico, Virginia. Having been much rejected by mainstream publishers, Greenlee's spy novel first was published by Allison & Busby in the UK in March 1969, after the author met Ghanaian-born editor Margaret Busby in London the previous year, and by the Richard W. Baron Publishing Company, in the US. It was subsequently translated into several languages, including French, Italian, Dutch, Japanese, Finnish, Swedish, and German.

Summary
The Spook Who Sat by the Door is set in the late 1960s and early 1970s, in the Chicago of Mayor Richard J. Daley. The story begins with Senator Hennington, a white, liberal senator who is facing a tight re-election vote, and so is looking for ways to win the Negro vote. His wife suggests that he accuse the Central Intelligence Agency (CIA) of racial discrimination, because the Agency has no black officers. Consequent to Senator Hennington's investigation, which assured a comfortable re-election, the CIA is required, for political reasons, to recruit Black Americans for training as case officers. Only Dan Freeman, secretly a black nationalist, successfully completes the training; of his recruitment class, he earned the highest grades and best marks for athleticism. Stationed in South Korea during the Korean War (1950–53), Freeman is an expert in hand-to-hand combat, especially judo; and played football at Michigan State University.

Having become the first black man in the Central Intelligence Agency, Freeman is given a desk job – Section Chief of the Top Secret Reproduction Center. Freeman understands that he is the token black man in the CIA, and that the CIA defines his presence as proof of the Agency's commitment to racial integration and social progress. When used as a "model Negro", and tasked to appear and speak at social and official events, he tells the story the audience wishes to hear. He has a distaste for the "snob-ridden", political world of Washington D.C., and especially the city's black middle class. Therefore, after completing his training in guerrilla warfare, weaponry, communications, and subversion, Freeman continues working at the CIA long enough to avoid raising suspicion about his motives for resigning from the CIA; and then returns to Chicago to work providing social services to black people.

On returning to the city, Freeman communicates with the Cobras, a street gang previously immune to appeals from social-service agencies. Immediately, he begins recruiting young black men from the ghettoes of Chicago, the "inner-city", to become Freedom fighters, by teaching them the guerrilla warfare skills and tactics he learned with the CIA. The Cobras' training includes a fight with the Comanches, a rival street gang; the study and appreciation of black poetry, music, and revolutionary leaders; a bank robbery on 115th and Halstead streets; and the robbery of a National Guard Armory on Cottage Grove Avenue. The Cobras have become a guerrilla group, with Dan Freeman as the secret leader, and, by means of violent and non-violent actions, set out to ensure that black people truly live freely in Chicago and the US. The "Freedom Fighters" of Chicago begin propaganda operations to tell the public about their guerrilla warfare throughout the US. To his guerrillas, Freeman says, "What we got now is a colony, what we want is a new nation." As armed revolt and war of liberation occur throughout the poor neighbourhoods of Chicago, the Illinois National Guard and the Chicago police desperately try to stop the black Freedom Fighters.

Learning the operational and tactical flaws of the National Guard's "sloppily trained and ill-disciplined" units, Freeman and the Freedom Fighters escalate their urban warfare in Chicago. First, they blow up the office of the mayor in the new City Hall building. Secondly, they paint a Negro alderman's car yellow and white. Thirdly, they take over radio stations and broadcast propaganda from "the Freedom Fighters, the Urban Underground of Black Chicago." Fourthly, they kidnap Colonel "Bull" Evans, the commander of the Illinois National Guard unit, drug him with LSD, and then release him.

After the Freedom Fighters start sniper attacks, killing National Guardsmen, Dan Freeman is visited by three old friends, two women and a man. After speaking with his female friends, Freeman's final guest is Dawson, a friend and also a Chicago police sergeant. Suspicious of Freeman, Sergeant Dawson had secretly entered Freeman's apartment; his suspicion was verified when he found Freedom Fighter propaganda. After an argument, Freeman attacks Dawson and kills him. He then calls the ranking Freedom Fighters to dispose of Dawson's body. The story closes with Freeman ordering "Condition Red", which order activates guerrilla attack-teams in 12 cities throughout the USA.

Title and background 
While using wordplay, the title of the novel, The Spook Who Sat by the Door, refers to a public-relations practice, in the early days of racial affirmative action in US society, whereby the first Black person hired by a company would be placed in an office that was close to and visible from the entrance of the business, so that everyone who entered could see that the company had a racially mixed staff of employees. The word spook has a dual meaning: (i) as a racial slur for a Black person, and (ii) as an intelligence-agency jargon word for a spy. The author also claimed a third layer of meaning for the novel's title: "that an armed revolution by Black people haunts White America, and has for centuries."

"My experiences were identical to those of Freeman in the CIA," Greenlee, a former US Army officer and United States Information Agency officer told The Washington Post in 1973. "Everything in that book is an actual quote. If it wasn't said to me, I overheard it."

The Spook Who Sat by the Door is a critical reflection upon the racism, violence, and oppression lived by African Americans in the United States. As such, the novel is a manual on how to be a successful revolutionary, by beating The System at their own game. The character of "Dan Freeman" demonstrates the importance of co-operation among oppressed peoples in fighting for equality and freedom. About the publication of the novel and the release of the film The Spook Who Sat by the Door (1973), directed by Ivan Dixon, Greenlee said:

Close collaboration between film director Ivan Dixon and screenplay writer Sam Greenlee realised a cinematic representation that did not lose or lessen the strong social analyses and encouragement to revolution in the novel.

In 2022, the novel's title and plot were referenced in "The Goof Who Sat By the Door", episode 8 of the comedy-drama television series Atlanta.

Historical context
The political atmosphere of the United States was especially restless in 1969, the year of publication of The Spook Who Sat by the Door, because the contentious politics for civil rights, for women's rights, and for gay rights movements had become visible in the public sphere. Sociologically, it is suggested that the Symbionese Liberation Army (SLA) – whose symbol was a seven-headed cobra – were influenced in their choice of name by Greenlee's use, in the novel, of the word symbiology, a term derived from the biological term symbiosis, which describes disparate organisms living together in a mutually beneficial relationship.

The original UK book-jacket for The Spook Who Sat by the Door carried endorsements by the political activist Dick Gregory, who called the novel "an important, original, nitty-gritty book"; by the novelist Len Deighton, who said that the book would "cause many readers great annoyance – and, what more can a writer ask, than that?"; and by the writer Stephen Vizinczey, who said the story is "in the manner of the best thrillers, the hero's life is always in danger, and there are women about who undress with passion, but might give him away. Still, there is more at stake than the hero's life or the reader's entertainment – this first-class thriller is also a genuine novel, which is not only exciting, but moving, as it unfolds the black man's dream, the white man's nightmare."

In Britain the novel's publication by Allison and Busby received much critical attention, including extracts being printed in The Observer magazine; however, Sam Greenlee later noted: "In contrast to more than one hundred reviews in Britain, most of them favourable, my novel was all but ignored by the American literary establishment."

Described as "the first black nationalist novel", The Spook Who Sat by the Door is also regarded as having inspired the "Blaxploitation" genre of films in the 1970s.

Adaptations
The book was adapted into the 1973 film of the same name, which was directed by Ivan Dixon from a screenplay co-written by Greenlee.

It was announced in August 2018 that Lee Daniels Entertainment had secured an option on The Spook Who Sat by the Door to develop it as the basis of a series with Fox 21 Television Studios. Leigh Dana Jackson was named in 2019 as the writer adapting the work for television. A pilot was ordered by FX in February 2021.

On April 14, 2021, actress Christina Jackson was reported to be cast in a leading role for the FX pilot of The Spook Who Sat by the Door. She will play Joy Freeman, wife of Dan Freeman (portrayed by series lead Y'lan Noel), described as an up-and-coming attorney committed to making a difference in her community.

In February 2022, it was reported that the pilot would not be moving forward but FX would redevelop the project.

Controversy
J. M. Berger of the International Centre for Counter-Terrorism writes that although the novel contains racist language against whites, "the book tends to get a pass on racism," and that "[w]hites in The Spook Who Sat by the Door are either overt racists or barely covert racists, without exception. No exchange between Freeman and a white character takes place without an expression of hostility and a critical racial commentary, sometimes nuanced, sometimes less so." The book also may be considered extremist in nature as Greenlee stated that "[i]t's a training manual for guerrilla warfare[....]"

Bibliography
 Greenlee, Sam. The Spook Who Sat by the Door (first edition London: Allison & Busby, March 1969; first US edition Richard W. Baron Publishing Co., 1969). Detroit: Wayne State University Press, 1989; new edition with Introduction by  Natiki Hope Pressley, June 2022, .

Further reading
 Adams, Sam, “The Spook Who Sat by the Door”. Philadelphia City Paper, 1 July 2004.
 Beale, Lewis. "'Spook' unearths a radical time capsule of a movie; Pulled from theaters but now on DVD, the 1973 film imagines a black political revolution in the blaxploitation era", Los Angeles Times, 28 February 2004.
 Canby, Vincent. "Using the CIA: Ex-Agent Is Spook Who Sat By The Door". The New York Times, 22 September 1973.
 Joiner, Lottie L. “After 30 years, a Controversial Film Re-Emerges”, The Crisis, November/December 2003: 41.
 Peavy, Charles D. "Four Black Revolutionary Novels, 1899–1970", Journal of Black Studies 1 (December 1970): 219–223.
 Chadwick, Alex, "Profile: Importance of the movie The Spook Who Sat by the Door on the release of a 30th anniversary DVD”, NPR All Things Considered, Washington D.C. 2 March 2004.

See also
 The Spook Who Sat by the Door (film)

References

External links
The Spook Who Sat By The Door, Wayne State University Press
The Spook Who Sat By the Door, The Pinocchio Theory.
 "BLACK DISPATCHES: The Original 'Spooks Who Sat by the Door' in the Age of Steam!" Chronicles of Harriet, 19 August 2012.
Tambay A. Obenson, "Watch 45-Minute A-to-Z Sam Greenlee Interview on 'The Spook Who Sat By the Door, Shadow and Act, 20 April 2015.
 Melvin T. Peters, "Sam Greenlee and the Revolutionary Tradition in African American Literature in the 19th–21st Centuries". Delivered at the Charles H. Wright Museum of African American History Liberation Film Series, 14 March 2015.
 Adam Langer, "These Radical Black Thrillers Fantasized About Dismantling the Police", The New York Times, 6 July 2020.

1969 American novels
1969 debut novels
African-American novels
Allison and Busby books
American novels adapted into films
American satirical novels
American spy novels
British novels adapted into films
Fiction books about the Central Intelligence Agency
Novels set in Chicago